Tay 2 is an Independent Local Radio station based in Dundee, Scotland, owned and operated by Bauer as part of the Greatest Hits Radio network. It broadcasts to Dundee, Perth and Tayside.

As of September 2022, the station has a weekly audience of 17,000 listeners according to RAJAR.

The station is due to be rebranded to Greatest Hits Radio Tayside and Fife  on 3 April 2023.

History

Radio Tay commenced broadcasting on 17 October 1980 in Dundee and 14 November 1980 in Perth with Gerry Quinn presenting the first show from the studios it still broadcasts from today at 6 North Isla Street in Dundee, near the city's Tannadice & Dens Park football stadia. The original schedule 6.0 Gerry Quinn 9.0 Graham Stuart 12.0 Tony Donald 2.0 Norma Gamble 4.0 Kenny Page 7.0 til 8pm Specialist Music Shows. The station only broadcast from 6am-8pm daily in the early years

On 9 January 1995 the station split its services/frequencies to become Tay AM and Tay FM. Both stations now also broadcast on DAB (Digital Audio Broadcasting – i.e. Digital Radio) and over the internet via their respective websites. Gary Robinson Presented the Tay FM Breakfast Show and Grant Reid on Radio Tay AM Breakfast along with Original presenters from 1980 rejoining the station Norma Gamble hosting Afternoons on Radio Tay AM and Kenny Page on Tay FM Drivetime along with another original presenter from 1980 Tony Donald presenting The weekend Goldmine now using the name Tony O'Donnell.

Tay 2 broadcasts on 1161 AM in Dundee and 1584 AM in Perth, and is more golden oldie than its sister station Tay FM, playing more classic hits from the past few decades, along with some of the more easy listening of modern-day offerings.

A new programming schedule was launched on 15 June 2009 which introduced some networked programming across Bauer's AM network. Tay AM retained its locally produced and presented breakfast and specialist evening shows (Tay AM was the only station to opt out of the network in the evenings, so they could continue to broadcast their heritage specialist shows), some weekend output, and Ally Ballingall's weekday mid-morning show, which was broadcast across Scotland from Radio Tay's Dundee studios. Outwith these times, programming was simulcast from other stations in the Scottish AM network.

On 3 June 2013, station owners Bauer Radio announced Tay AM would axe its remaining local programming with the weekday breakfast show, replaced with a networked show hosted by Robin Galloway from Monday 1 July 2013 across Bauer's network of AM stations in Scotland. Local news & traffic bulletins were retained with some networked programming broadcast from Tay AM's Dundee studios.

On 5 January 2015, Tay AM was renamed Tay 2 and became part of the Greatest Hits Radio network in Scotland and Northern England.

Programming
Most of Tay 2's programming is carried from Greatest Hits Radio's network of locally branded Scottish stations with some off-peak output also carried from GHR's sister network in England.
Most of the output originates from the studios of Clyde 2 in Clydebank, Forth 2 in Edinburgh and from Greatest Hits Radio's Birmingham, Nottingham, London and Manchester studios. Occasional programming is produced and broadcast from MFR 2 in Inverness, Northsound 2 in Aberdeen and West Sound in Ayrshire and Dumfries and Galloway

News 
Tay 2 broadcasts local news bulletins hourly from 6am to 7pm on weekdays and from 7am to 1pm at weekends. Headlines are broadcast on the half-hour during weekday breakfast and drivetime shows, alongside sport and traffic bulletins.

National bulletins from Sky News Radio are carried overnight with bespoke networked Scottish bulletins at weekends, produced from Radio Clyde's newsroom in Clydebank.

See also 
 Tay FM
 Radio Tay

References

External links
 

Bauer Radio
Greatest Hits Radio
Radio stations in Dundee
Radio stations established in 1995